Hyundai Pride is a container ship, built according to the latest IMO and MARPOL standards. The ship was ordered in 2011 and completed in July 2014 by Daewoo Shipbuilding & Marine Engineering in Geoje, South Korea.

Design 
Hyundai Pride was ordered by Hyundai Merchant Marine in August 2011 at the shipyard of Daewoo Shipbuilding & Marine Engineering in Geoje, South Korea. The vessel was planned to start serving the G6 Asia-Europe Loop 6 sea line of the company. The cargo ship has deadweight  and gross tonnage . With such dimensions the vessel can carry 13,154 TEU and has 900 reefer points for transportation of temperature controlled containers.

Engineering 

The main engine is a Hyundai-MAN B&W 10S90ME-C9.2, which was special development of the Hyundai with improved power and lower fuel consumption. The engine has output power of 85,670 hp at 86 rpm and NOx emissions 4.4 g/KW.h. With such engine the container ship can achiever service speed of 24.5 kn, while the maximum is over 27.0 kn. The vessel Hyundai Pride has also four diesel generators HIMSEN 8H32/40, which support the equipment and cargo handling systems.

See also 
 NYK Vega
 Stena Paris

References

External links

Container ships
Marshall Islands
2014 ships
Ships built by Daewoo Shipbuilding & Marine Engineering